GDRC may refer to:

 Global Development Research Center
 Government of the Democratic Republic of the Congo